The Taranaki Province was a province of New Zealand from 1853 until the abolition of provincial government in 1876. Initially known as New Plymouth Province, the province was renamed on 1 January 1859 as the Taranaki Province.

Area
European settlement started in New Plymouth in 1841, which was the province's capital. For the first 30 years, European settlement did not extend many miles beyond New Plymouth.

History
Iwi from the Waikato region threatened these Ngāti Awa, and during the 1820s, many of the inhabitants left Taranaki. In 1832, Waikato iwi launched an assault with firearms, resulting in the remaining Ngāti Awa being killed or going into slavery apart from the Otaku pā in New Plymouth. When English emigrants arrived in 1841, they found deserted land.

The settlement of the province was organised by the Plymouth Company, a subsidiary of the New Zealand Company which was later absorbed into its parent company. Taranaki was chosen for the settlement by the surveyor Frederic Carrington, and New Plymouth was the only town founded in the country founded through organised settlement that lacked a natural harbour. Carrington argued that fertile land and natural harbours don't come together in New Zealand, and that the land is more important for the settlement, and an artificial harbour will later be affordable. He was present when the breakwater was built 40 years after New Plymouth had been founded.

Anniversary Day
New Zealand law still provides an anniversary day for each province. Taranaki Anniversary Day is celebrated annually on the second Monday in March.

Superintendents

The Taranaki Province had four Superintendents:

Legislation
No surviving legislation.

References

External links
 Map of the North Island provinces
 The Seal of New Plymouth - on reverse of coin

History of Taranaki
Provinces of New Zealand
States and territories established in 1853
1876 disestablishments in New Zealand
1853 establishments in New Zealand